Jorge Verstrynge Rojas (born September 22, 1948) is a Spanish former politician, activist and political scientist, professor in the Complutense University of Madrid. Close to neofascist movements in his youth and Secretary-General of People's Alliance in the 1980s, he experimented along his political career an ideological switch towards leftist positions.

Biography 

Born 22 September 1948 in Tangier, he is son of a Spanish mother and a Belgian father, Willy Verstrynge-Thalloen, follower of Léon Degrelle during the Second World War. During his youth in Morocco and Algeria he was also influenced by his stepfather, a French communist called René Mazel. He moved from France to Spain in order to finish his secondary education and entering the University. He became one of the proponents of Nouvelle Droite ideas within People's Alliance (AP).
Secretary General of AP from  1979 to 1986, he was considered the protégé of Manuel Fraga, leader of the party. He also was, within People's Alliance, one of the promoters of the Club del Sable ("Club of the Sabre").

He ran as AP's Mayoral candidate in the 1983 Madrid City Council election, but his candidature was beaten by the Spanish Socialist Workers' Party (PSOE), led by the Mayor Enrique Tierno Galván. After a rift with Fraga, he left AP in 1986; he became member of the PSOE in 1993. He left the party, and became advisor of Francisco Frutos, leader of the United Left. In 2014 he became an advisor of Pablo Iglesias, leader of Podemos.

Notes

References

Bibliography 
 
 
 
 
 
 
 

 



1948 births
Living people
People from Tangier
People's Alliance (Spain) politicians
Academic staff of the Complutense University of Madrid
Spanish political scientists
Spanish people of Belgian descent
Far-right politics in Spain